Never Say Goodbye is a musical with a book and lyrics by Shûichirô Koike and music by Frank Wildhorn. It was written specifically for Takarazuka Revue, the all-female Japanese theatre company. Wildhorn was the first non-Japanese to write an original musical for the company.

Set against the background of the Spanish Civil War, the plot centers on socialist playwright Katherine McGregor and renowned photographer Georges Malraux, a Polish Jew who fled his homeland for Paris. The two first meet in Hollywood at a party announcing the film adaptation of Katherine's play Tempest in Spain, based on the opera Carmen. The two are reunited in Barcelona, where they unexpectedly find themselves falling in love as they become embroiled in a battle against fascism.

Directed by Koike, the production was staged in 2006 at the Takarazuka Grand Theater in Takarazuka, Hyōgo from March 24 through May 8, and at the Tokyo Takarazuka Theater in Tokyo, Japan from May 26 through July 2. The cast included Mari Hanafusa as Katherine and Yōka Wao as Georges. Never Say Goodbye marked the final performance of both stars before their retirement from the troupe.

A full-length cast recording, a folio of sheet music, and a video and DVD of the show have been released.

Song list

Act I
Coconut Grove
The Girl I Look For
Fake City
Je Suis Un Déraciné (I Am One Uprooted)
Never Say Goodbye
Olimpiada Popular
People's Art
The Outbreak of The Civil War
Without Bullfight
That's What I Can't Do
No Pasaran! 
Centuria Olimpiada
One Card
No Pasaran! (Reprise)
The Woman of My Life
Meant for Each Other
We Are "Camarada"
One Heart 

Act II
San Giordi Fiesta
Purge of the PSUC
Conflict of Love
The Woman of My Life (Reprise) 
Centuria Olimpiada (Reprise)
Je Suis Un Déraciné (Reprise) 
Propaganda
Charity
Tragedy in Barcelona
Battlefield
One Heart
The Truth of Love

References

External links
Never Say Goodbye at Takarazuka Revue TakaWiki! Fan site
Photos from the Tokyo production

2006 musicals
Takarazuka Revue
Musicals by Frank Wildhorn